Origin recognition complex subunit 5 is a protein that in humans is encoded by the ORC5 (ORC5L) gene.

Function 

The origin recognition complex (ORC) is a highly conserved six subunit protein complex essential for the initiation of the DNA replication in eukaryotic cells. Studies in yeast demonstrated that ORC binds specifically to origins of replication and serves as a platform for the assembly of additional initiation factors such as Cdc6 and Mcm proteins. The protein encoded by this gene is a subunit of the ORC complex. It has been shown to form a core complex with ORC2L, -3L, and 4L. Alternatively spliced transcript variants encoding distinct isoforms have been described.

Interactions 

ORC5 has been shown to interact with:

 MCM2, 
 MCM3,
 MCM4,
 MCM7, 
 ORC1, 
 ORC2, 
 ORC3,  and
 ORC4.

References

Further reading